Tereza Hyťhová (born 23 February 1995) is a Czech politician and former member of the Chamber of Deputies. She was elected to represent the Ústí nad Labem Region for Freedom and Direct Democracy in October 2017, before defecting to the Tricolour Citizens' Movement in July 2020. She was a member of the Chamber of Deputies' Schools and Social Committee.

References

1995 births
Living people
21st-century Czech women politicians
Freedom and Direct Democracy MPs
Tricolour Citizens' Movement politicians
Jan Evangelista Purkyně University in Ústí nad Labem alumni
Members of the Chamber of Deputies of the Czech Republic (2017–2021)